

List of countries

References

Eastern Asia